The Journal of Tort Law is a peer reviewed law review covering tort law. It was established in 2006 and is published by the Berkeley Electronic Press. The editors-in-chief are John Goldberg and Jules Coleman. The journal is indexed in Index to Foreign Legal Periodicals, Intute, Scopus, and Westlaw. According to the Washington and Lee Law Journal Ranking, the Journal of Tort Law has the highest impact factor among 7 journals specializing in tort law and was overall ranked 64th among 1087 law journals in 2010.

References

External links 
 

American law journals
English-language journals
Tort law
Publications established in 2006
Biannual journals